Blue Ridge is the sixth studio album (eighth total album) released by the singer-songwriter Jonathan Edwards. It features the Bluegrass band, The Seldom Scene.

Track listing
 "Don't This Road Look Rough and Rocky" (Lester Flatt, Earl Scruggs) – 3:37
 "How Long Have I Been Waiting for You" (Jonathan Edwards) – 1:57
 "Blue Ridge" (Bob Artis, Rick Mallis) – 3:31
 "Seven Daffodils" (Lee Hays, Fran Moseley) – 3:42
 "Sunshine" (Jonathan Edwards) – 2:57
 "Back to Where I Don't Belong" (Phil Rosenthal) – 2:40
 "If I Gave You" (Gray, Gray, Martin) – 2:36
 "Honey, I Won't Be Around" (Phil Rosenthal) – 2:53
 "Only a Hobo" (Bob Dylan) – 3:22
 "God Gave You to Me" (Ralph Stanley) – 2:47
 "Little Hands" (Jonathan Edwards) – 3:08
 "I Don't Believe I'll Stay Here Anymore" (Al Anderson) – 3:26
 "Don't Crawfish Me, Baby" (Jody Emerson, Wild Bill Emerson) – 4:17

Personnel
 Jonathan Edwards – vocals, guitar, harmonica
The Seldom Scene
 Phil Rosenthal – guitar, vocals
 John Duffey – mandolin, vocals
 Ben Eldridge – banjo, guitar, vocals
 Mike Auldridge – Dobro, guitar, vocals
 Tom Gray – bass, vocals
with:
 Kenny White – piano
 Robbie Magruder – percussion
Technical
Bill McElroy - engineer
Raymond Simone - cover design

References

External links
Seldom Scene official website

1985 albums
Collaborative albums
Jonathan Edwards (musician) albums
The Seldom Scene albums
Sugar Hill Records albums